MTV Unplugged is a 2004 Grammy Award-nominated live MTV Unplugged acoustic performance by Argentine-born musician Diego Torres released in 2004 as an album and in 2005 as a DVD. Recorded in March, 2004 in Buenos Aires, Argentina, it is rated as one of his best-ever live performances.

Release

Singles 
 Cantar Hasta Morir (2004)
 Tratar de Estar Mejor (2004)
 Sueños (with Julieta Venegas) (2005)
 Déjame Entrar (2005)

Track listing

Charts and sales

Charts

Sales and certifications

References 

Mtv Unplugged (Torres, Diego album)
Diego Torres live albums
2004 live albums
Live video albums
2005 video albums
RCA Records live albums
RCA Records video albums
Sony BMG Norte live albums
Sony BMG Norte video albums
Latin Grammy Award for Best Engineered Album